Batho Pele (Sotho-Tswana: "People First") is a South African political initiative. The initiative was first introduced by the Mandela Administration on October 1, 1997, to stand for the better delivery of goods and services to the public. 
The Batho Pele initiative aims to enhance the quality and accessibility of government services by improving efficiency and accountability to the recipients of public goods and services.

Batho Pele requires that eight service delivery principles be implemented

  regularly consult with customers
  set service standards
  increase access to services
  ensure higher levels of courtesy
  provide more and better information about services
  increase openness and transparency about services
  remedy failures and mistakes
  give the best possible value for money.

External links
 Meaning of Batho Pele

References

Government of South Africa